The  is a 17.6 km railway line in Gifu Prefecture, Japan, operated by the private railway operator Nagoya Railroad (Meitetsu), connecting Meitetsu-Gifu Station in the city of Gifu with Shin-Unuma Station in Kakamigahara.

Stations 
● L: 
● E: 
● R: 
● MU:

History
The line was opened between 1926 and 1927 by the Mino Electric Railway, electrified at 600 V DC. The company merged with Meitetsu in 1935. The Gifu to Ogase section was double-tracked between 1938 and 1942, with the Ogase to Shin-Unuma section being double-tracked in 1964, the same year the voltage was increased to 1,500 V DC, enabling the maximum speed on the line to be raised from 65 km/h to 85 km/h.

Former connecting lines
A 1 km line branched off at Tagami Station, providing a connection to the Gifu Tram network (which was also 1,067 mm gauge) operated between 1970 and 2005 (when the tram system closed). It changed voltage (with a short dead section) to 600 V DC at the Keirinjo-mae end of the line.

Rail transport in Gifu Prefecture
Kakamigahara Line
1067 mm gauge railways in Japan